Vikramaditya I (655–680 CE) was the third son and followed his father, Pulakeshi II on to the Chalukya throne.  He restored order in the fractured kingdom and made the Pallavas retreat from the capital Vatapi.

Vikramaditya inherited the traditional titles of the dynasty, including Satyashraya ("refuge of truth") and Shri-prithvi-vallabha ("lord of goddess of wealth and earth"; variants include Shri-vallabha and Vallabha). He also bore the titles Maharajadhiraja ("king of great kings"), Rajadhiraja ("king of kings"), Parameshvara ("Supreme Lord"), and Bhattaraka ("great lord").

His titles indicative of his military power include Rana-rasika ("lover of war"), Anivarita ("unopposed"), and Raja-malla ("royal wrestler").

Early life and career 

Vikramaditya was one of the several sons of the powerful Chalukya king Pulakeshin II, as attested by the contemporary records of the family. The records of the later Chalukyas of Kalyani, who claimed descent from Vikramaditya's family, describe him as a son of Pulakeshin's son Adityavarman. These records, such as the Kauthem inscription and Ranna's Gadaayuddha, can be dismissed as inaccurate.

Pulakeshin II was defeated and probably killed during the Pallava invasion of the Chalukya capital Vatapi around c. 642 CE. The Chalukya history over the next decade is unclear: it is possible that after Pulakeshin's death, his son Adityavarman held the throne, followed by Adityavarman's son Abhinavaditya, and then by Pulakeshin's son Chandraditya. After Chandraditya, his wife Vijaya-Bhattarika appears to have acted as a regent for their minor son. During her regency, Vikramaditya appears to have risen to prominence as the supreme commander of the Chalukya army, becoming the de facto ruler in the process.

The inscriptions of Vikramaditya state that he obtained the "regal fortune of his father which had been concealed by three kings", and thus "made the entire burden of royalty rest upon one person". Historian K. A. Nilakanta Sastri theorized that beside the Pallava king, the two other kings referred to in this sentence were Adityavarman and  Chandraditya. According to this theory, the Chalukya kingdom was divided among the three brothers and the Pallavas after Pulakeshin's death, and Vikramaditya united it by subjugating the others. In his support, Sastri cited the undated Kurnool copper-plate inscription which states that Vikramaditya ascended the throne after "conquering all his kinsmen". However, this inscription is considered spurious, and Sastri himself admitted that its authenticity is doubtful. There is no evidence that the Chalukya kingdom was partitioned among the three brothers. Had Vikramaditya been one of the rival claimants to the throne after Pulakehsin's death, he would have dated the start of his reign from c. 642 CE, not c. 655 CE, in his inscriptions. Moreover, the Kochare and Nerur inscriptions of his sister-in-law Vijaya-Bhattarika mention him positively, but do not accord any royal titles to him. Based on these evidences, scholars such as D. C. Sircar theorize that Vikramaditya fought against the Pallavas as a subordinate of his brothers, and ascended the throne only after their deaths. The term "three kings" apparently refers to the Chola, Chera, and Pandya rulers who had allied with the Pallavas.

Besides Adityavarman and Chandraditya, two other brothers of Vikramaditya are known: Ranaragha-varman and Dharashraya Jayasimha-varman. The Honnur copper-plate inscription states that Ranaragha was his elder brother, and donated some land to Brahmanas during his reign. In accordance with the contemporary tradition, Ranaragha would have been ahead of Vikramaditya in the precedence to the throne: it is not clear why Vikramaditya became the king instead of him, and no other surviving source mentions him. Dharashraya Jayasimha was Vikramaditya's younger brother, and governed the north-western part of the Chalukya kingdom as his subordinate.

The c. 674 CE (Shaka year 596) Gadval inscription of Vikramaditya is dated to his 12th regnal year, which suggests that he ascended the throne in c. 655 CE (Shaka year 577). This may have happened possibly after the son of Chandraditya and Vijaya died (naturally or otherwise).

Military career  

Vikramaditya, with the help of his maternal grandfather Bhuvikarma or Durvineet of Western Ganga Dynasty set himself the task of repelling the Pallava invasion and restoring the unity of his father's kingdom. He was able to end Pallava's occupation, which had lasted for thirteen years and captured Vatapi. He defeated his brothers and other feudatories who wished to divide the empire. Vikramaditya then declared himself king of the Chalukyas (655). He rewarded his younger brother Jayasimhavarma who was loyal to him, with the viceroyalty of Lata in the southern Gujarat.

Vikramaditya continued his enmity with Narasimhavarman's son and successor  Mahendravarman II, and later with his son Paramesvaravarman I. Vikramaditya allied himself with the Pallava's other enemy the Pandyan Arikesari Parankusa Maravarman (670 – 700).

Early in the reign of Paramesvaravarman, Vikramaditya advanced to the neighbourhood of the Pallava capital Kanchipuram. Vikramaditya advanced to the banks of the Kaveri and encamped at Urayur. The Pallava Paramesvaravarman gathered a large army and went into battle with the Chalukya ally Ganga Bhuvikrama at a place called Vilande. The Pallava king was victorious in this battle (670).

Paramesvara then sent an expedition into the Chalukya country. In the ensuing battle of Puruvalanallur in 674 with Vikramaditya's forces, the Pallavas defeated the Chalukyas. The defeated Chalukyan army was led by Vikramaditya's son and grandson Vinayaditya and Vijayaditya. Pallavas went on to occupy many of the Chalukya territories but later left after the chalukyas agreed to pay yearly tributes.

During this time, Jayasimha, brother of Vikramaditya I who ruled as governor of Gujarat province defeated the ruler of Vallabhi, Vajjada the ruler of the Maitraka family. This victory is considered important.
The Chalukyan empire however had put the worst behind under Vikramaditya I and recovered most of its  territories it controlled under Pulakeshin II.

Vikramaditya I was married to the Western Ganga princess Gangamahadevi. Some historians compare him to his illustrious father Pulakeshin II.

Death and succession

Vikramaditya died in 680 and his son Vinayaditya succeeded him on the Chalukya throne.

References

Bibliography

Further reading 
 Nilakanta Sastri, K.A. (1935). The CōĻas, University of Madras, Madras (Reprinted 1984).
 Nilakanta Sastri, K.A. (1955). A History of South India, OUP, New Delhi (Reprinted 2002).
 Dr. Suryanath U. Kamat (2001). Concise History of Karnataka, MCC, Bangalore (Reprinted 2002).
 South Indian Inscriptions - http://www.whatisindia.com/inscriptions/
  History of Karnataka, Mr. Arthikaje

680 deaths
7th-century Indian monarchs
Early Chalukyas
655 births